50th Birthday Celebration Volume 5 is a live album of improvised music by Fred Frith and John Zorn documenting their performance at Tonic in September 2003 as part of Zorn's month-long 50th Birthday Celebration concert series.

Reception
The Allmusic review by Sean Westergaard awarded the album 4 stars stating "The interplay is simply amazing. Much of it is what you'd expect from free improv, but there are a handful of beautiful, lyrical moments, like those that close the set. Any fan of free improvisation will be thrilled. It doesn't get much better than this."

Track listing

Recorded live at Tonic in New York City on September 15, 2003

Personnel
John Zorn – alto saxophone 
Fred Frith – guitars

References

2004 live albums
Albums produced by John Zorn
John Zorn live albums
Fred Frith live albums
Tzadik Records live albums
Collaborative albums
Live free improvisation albums